Gjirokastër Obelisk or Mëmëdheu ABC is an obelisk monument in Gjirokastër, Albania. The obelisk is located near the first Albanian school to be opened in the town in 1908 and is a symbol for education in Albania.
The authors of the obelisk are Muntaz Dhrami, Ksenofon Kostaqi, Stefan Papamihali. The three of them is given the prize "Honour of the City of Gjirokaster" in 2008 from the Municipality of Gjirokastër for their artistic work for the city.

References

Buildings and structures in Gjirokastër
Monuments and memorials in Albania
Obelisks
Tourist attractions in Gjirokastër County